Sardinella neglecta (East African sardinella) is a species of ray-finned fish in the genus Sardinella from the Indian Ocean, from the east coast of Africa.

Footnotes 
 

neglecta
Fish of the Indian Ocean
Fish described in 1983